Ziga is a village located in the municipality of Baztan, Navarre, Spain. It has a population of 196 as of 2010.

References 

Populated places in Navarre